The following table is a list of the 23 provinces and the Autonomous City of Buenos Aires of Argentina, ranked in order of their total population based on data from the 2022, 2010 and 2001 censuses from the National Institute of Statistics and Census of Argentina.

References

Provinces of Argentina